Lee Ha-jun is a Korean production designer. He was nominated for an Academy Award in the category Best Production Design for the film Parasite.

Selected filmography 
 Parasite (2019; co-nominated with Won-woo Cho)

References

External links 

Living people
Place of birth missing (living people)
Year of birth missing (living people)
Production designers